Ronald Alexander Pimentel (born September 17, 1985) is a professional football player.

Club career
Pimentel started his career at Salvadoran Second Division side Once Municipal in 2000, clinching promotion with them to the top tier and winning the Apertura 2006 tournament.

In 2007, he left them for Chalatenango, only to join Alianza a year later. After a year at Luis Ángel Firpo in 2010, he rejoined Once Municipal for the Clausura 2011 season.

International career
Pimentel made his debut for El Salvador in a November 2006 friendly match against Panama. He has not played any international matches since.

References

External links

1985 births
Living people
People from Sonsonate Department
Association football midfielders
Salvadoran footballers
El Salvador international footballers
Once Municipal footballers
C.D. Chalatenango footballers
Alianza F.C. footballers
C.D. Luis Ángel Firpo footballers